The following jurisdictions in the United States are or have been subject to the special provisions of the Voting Rights Act of 1965. Jurisdictions encompassed by the coverage formula contained in Section 4(b) are called "covered jurisdictions"; covered jurisdictions are subject to preclearance under Section 5. Covered jurisdictions may "bail out" of coverage, while non-covered jurisdictions may be "bailed in" to coverage. The Act's bilingual assistance provision is independent of the other special provisions, and jurisdictions encompassed by this provision are listed separately.

Coverage formula
The coverage formula, contained in Section 4(b) of the Act, determines which states are subject to preclearance. As enacted in 1965, the first element in the formula was whether, on November 1, 1964, the state or a political subdivision of the state maintained a "test or device" restricting the opportunity to register and vote. The Act's definition of a "test or device" included such requirements as the applicant being able to pass a literacy test, establish that he or she had good moral character, or have another registered voter vouch for his or her qualifications. The second element of the formula would be satisfied if the Director of the Census determined that less than 50 percent of persons of voting age were registered to vote on November 1, 1964, or that less than 50 percent of persons of voting age voted in the presidential election of November 1964. In 1970, Congress recognized the continuing need for the special provisions of the Act, which were due to expire that year, and renewed them for another five years. It added a second prong to the coverage formula, identical to the original formula except that it referenced November 1968 as the relevant date for the maintenance of a test or device and the levels of voter registration and electoral participation. In 1975, the Act's special provisions were extended for another seven years, and were broadened to address voting discrimination against members of "language minority groups," which were defined as persons who are American Indian, Asian American, Alaskan Natives or of Spanish heritage." As before, Congress expanded the coverage formula, based on the presence of tests or devices and levels of voter registration and participation as of November 1972. In addition, the 1965 definition of "test or device" was expanded to include the practice of providing any election information, including ballots, only in English in states or political subdivisions where members of a single language minority constituted more than five percent of the citizens of voting age. In 1982, the coverage formula was extended again, this time for 25 years, but no changes were made to it. In 2006, the coverage formula was again extended for 25 years. In Shelby County v. Holder (2013), the Supreme Court of the United States struck down the coverage formula as unconstitutional, meaning that no jurisdiction is currently subject to preclearance under the coverage formula.

Jurisdictions encompassed by coverage formula
All counties and municipalities within a covered state are covered unless they have bailed out; counties and municipalities covered by virtue of being within a covered state are not included in this list. The following jurisdictions were encompassed by the coverage formula before the Supreme Court announced its decision.

1965
The following jurisdictions were brought into coverage under the original coverage formula contained within the unrevised Voting Rights Act of 1965:

States:
Alabama
Georgia
Louisiana
Mississippi
South Carolina
Virginia
Counties:
North Carolina:
 Anson County, North Carolina
 Beaufort County, North Carolina
 Bertie County, North Carolina
 Bladen County, North Carolina
 Camden County, North Carolina
 Caswell County, North Carolina
 Chowan County, North Carolina
 Cleveland County, North Carolina
 Craven County, North Carolina
 Cumberland County, North Carolina
 Edgecombe County, North Carolina
 Franklin County, North Carolina
 Gaston County, North Carolina
 Gates County, North Carolina
 Granville County, North Carolina
 Greene County, North Carolina
 Guilford County, North Carolina
 Halifax County, North Carolina
 Harnett County, North Carolina
 Hertford County, North Carolina
 Hoke County, North Carolina
 Lee County, North Carolina
 Lenoir County, North Carolina
 Martin County, North Carolina
 Nash County, North Carolina
 Northampton County, North Carolina
 Onslow County, North Carolina
 Pasquotank County, North Carolina
 Perquimans County, North Carolina
 Person County, North Carolina
 Pitt County, North Carolina
 Robeson County, North Carolina
 Rockingham County, North Carolina
 Scotland County, North Carolina
 Union County, North Carolina
 Vance County, North Carolina
 Wake County, North Carolina
 Washington County, North Carolina
 Wayne County, North Carolina
 Wilson County, North Carolina

1970
The following additional jurisdictions became subject to preclearance after the coverage formula was amended in 1970:
Counties:
California:
 Monterey County, California
 Yuba County, California
New York:
 Bronx County, New York
 Kings County, New York
 New York County
Municipalities:
New Hampshire:
 Rindge, New Hampshire
 Millsfield Township, New Hampshire
 Pinkhams Grant, New Hampshire
 Stewartstown, New Hampshire
 Stratford, New Hampshire
 Benton, New Hampshire
 Antrim, New Hampshire
 Boscawen, New Hampshire
 Newington, New Hampshire
 Unity, New Hampshire

1975
The following additional jurisdictions became subject to preclearance after the coverage formula was amended in 1975:
States:
Alaska
Arizona
Texas
Counties:
California:
 Kings County, California
 Merced County, California
 Yuba County, California
Florida:
 Collier County, Florida
 Hardee County, Florida
 Hendry County, Florida
 Hillsborough County, Florida
 Monroe County, Florida
New York:
 Bronx County, New York
 Kings County, New York
North Carolina:
 Jackson County, North Carolina
South Dakota:
 Shannon County, South Dakota
 Todd County, South Dakota
Municipalities:
Michigan:
 Clyde Township, Michigan
 Buena Vista Township, Michigan

Jurisdictions bailed out of coverage 
Covered jurisdictions may have their coverage terminated by succeeding in a "bail out" action in court. Effective August 5, 1984, the bail out provision was liberalized, allowing more jurisdictions to bail out of coverage. The following jurisdictions have bailed out of coverage:

Before August 1984
Wake County, North Carolina
Curry, McKinley, and Otero Counties, New Mexico
Towns of Cadwell, Limestone, Ludlow, Nashville, Reed, Woodland, Connor, New Gloucester, Sullivan, Winter Harbor, Chelsea, Sommerville, Carroll, Charleston, Webster, Waldo, Beddington, and Cutler, Maine
Choctaw and McCurtain Counties, Oklahoma
Campbell County, Wyoming
Towns of Amherst, Ayer, Belchertown, Bourne, Harvard, Sandwich, Shirley, Sunderland, and Wrentham, Massachusetts
Towns of Groton, Mansfield, and Southbury, Connecticut
El Paso County, Colorado
Honolulu County, Hawaii
Elmore County, Idaho

After August 1984
City of Fairfax, Virginia (including City of Fairfax School Board)
Frederick County, Virginia (including Frederick County School Board; Towns of Middletown and Stephens City; and Frederick County Shawneeland Sanitary District)
Shenandoah County, Virginia (including Shenandoah County School Board; Towns of Edinburg, Mount Jackson, New Market, Strasburg, Toms Brook, and Woodstock; Stoney Creek Sanitary District; and Toms Brook-Maurertown Sanitary District)
Roanoke County, Virginia (including Roanoke County School Board and Town of Vinton)
City of Winchester, Virginia
City of Harrisonburg, Virginia (including Harrisonburg City School Board)
Rockingham County, Virginia (including Rockingham County School Board and Towns of Bridgewater, Broadway, Dayton, Elkton, Grottoes, Mt. Crawford, and Timberville)
Warren County, Virginia (including Warren County School Board and Town of Front Royal)
Greene County, Virginia (including Greene County School Board and Town of Standardsville)
Pulaski County, Virginia (including Pulaski County School Board and Towns of Pulaski and Dublin)
Augusta County, Virginia (including Augusta County School Board and Town of Craigsville)
City of Salem, Virginia
Botetourt County, Virginia (including Botetourt County School Board and Towns of Buchanan, Fincastle, and Troutville)
Essex County, Virginia (including Essex County School Board and Town of Tappahannock)
Middlesex County, Virginia (including Middlesex County School Board and Town of Urbanna)
Amherst County, Virginia (including Town of Amherst)
Page County, Virginia (including Page County School Board and Towns of Luray, Stanley, and Shenandoah)
Washington County, Virginia (including Washington County School Board and Towns of Abington, Damascus, and Glade Spring)
Northwest Austin Municipal Utility District Number One, Texas
City of Kings Mountain, North Carolina
City of Sandy Springs, Georgia
Jefferson County Drainage District Number Seven, Texas
Alta Irrigation District, California
City of Manassas Park, Virginia
Rappahannock County, Virginia (including Rappahannock County School Board and Town of Washington)
Bedford County, Virginia (including Bedford County School Board)
City of Bedford, Virginia
Culpeper County, Virginia (including Culpeper County School Board and Town of Culpeper)
James City County, Virginia (including Williamsburg-James City County School Board)
City of Williamsburg, Virginia
King George County, Virginia (including King George County School District)
Prince William County, Virginia (including Prince William County School District and Towns of Dumfries, Haymarket, Occoquan, and Quantico)
City of Pinson, Alabama
Wythe County, Virginia (including Wythe County School Board and Towns of Rural Retreat and Wytheville)
Grayson County, Virginia (including Grayson County  School Board and Towns of Fries, Independence, and Troutdale)
Merced County, California (including approximately 84 subjurisdictions)
Craig County, Virginia (including Craig County School District and Town of New Castle)
Carroll County, Virginia (including Carroll County School District and Town of Hillsville)

Jurisdictions bailed into coverage
Courts may "bail in" non-covered jurisdictions and require them to submit some or all of their voting changes for preclearance. The preclearance requirements for these "bailed in" jurisdictions were unaffected by the Supreme Court's ruling in Shelby County v. Holder. The following jurisdictions have been bailed into coverage under Section 3(c) of the Voting Rights Act:
Thurston County, Nebraska
Escambia County, Florida
Alexander County, Illinois
Gadsden County School District, Florida
State of New Mexico
McKinley County, New Mexico
Sandoval County, New Mexico
City of Chattanooga, Tennessee
Montezuma-Cortez School District RE-1, Colorado
State of Arkansas
Los Angeles County, California
Cibola County, New Mexico
Socorro County, New Mexico
Alameda County, California
Bernalillo County, New Mexico
Buffalo County, South Dakota
Charles Mix County, South Dakota
Village of Port Chester, New York

Jurisdictions encompassed by the Section 203 bilingual elections requirement
The following jurisdictions are subject to the Section 203 bilingual elections requirement:

Alaska
 Aleutians East Borough (Filipino, Hispanic, Yup'ik)
 Aleutians West Census Area (Aleut, Filipino)
 Bethel Census Area (Inupiat, Yup'ik)
 Bristol Bay Borough (Yup'ik)
 Dillingham Census Area (Yup'ik)
 Kenai Peninsula Borough (Yup'ik)
 Kodiak Island Borough (Yup'ik)
 Lake and Peninsula Borough (Yup'ik)
 Nome Census Area (Inupiat, Yup'ik)
 North Slope Borough (Inupiat)
 Northwest Arctic Borough (Inupiat)
 Southeast Fairbanks Census Area (Alaskan Athabascan)
 Valdez-Cordova Census Area (Alaskan Athabascan)
 Wade Hampton Census Area (Inupiat, Yup'ik)
 Yukon-Koyukuk Census Area (Alaskan Athabascan, Inupiat)

Arizona
 Apache County, Arizona (American Indian (Navajo))
 Coconino County, Arizona (American Indian (Navajo))
 Gila County, Arizona (American Indian (Apache))
 Graham County, Arizona (American Indian (Apache))
 Maricopa County, Arizona (Hispanic)
 Navajo County, Arizona (American Indian (Navajo))
 Pima County, Arizona (Hispanic)
 Pinal County, Arizona (American Indian (Apache))
 Santa Cruz County, Arizona (Hispanic)
 Yuma County, Arizona (Hispanic)

California 
In addition to the jurisdictions enumerated below, California has state coverage for the Hispanic Language Minority Group.
 Alameda County, California (Chinese (including Taiwanese), Filipino, Hispanic, Vietnamese)
 Colusa County, California (Hispanic)
 Contra Costa County, California (Chinese (including Taiwanese), Hispanic))
 Del Norte County, California (American Indian (All other American Indian Tribes))
 Fresno County, California (Hispanic)
 Glenn County, California (Hispanic)
 Imperial County, California (Hispanic)
 Kern County, California (Hispanic)
 Kings County, California (Hispanic)
 Los Angeles County, California (Cambodian, Chinese (including Taiwanese), Filipino, Hispanic, Korean, Vietnamese))
 Madera County, California (Hispanic)
 Merced County, California (Hispanic)
 Monterey County, California (Hispanic)
 Orange County, California (Chinese (including Taiwanese), Hispanic, Korean, Vietnamese))
 Riverside County, California (Hispanic)
 Sacramento County, California (Chinese (including Taiwanese), Hispanic))
 San Benito County, California (Hispanic)
 San Bernardino County, California (Hispanic)
 San Diego County, California (American Indian (All other American Indian Tribes), Chinese (including Taiwanese), Filipino, Hispanic, Vietnamese))
 San Francisco County, California (Chinese (including Taiwanese), Hispanic))
 San Joaquin County, California (Hispanic)
 San Mateo County, California (Chinese (including Taiwanese), Hispanic))
 Santa Barbara County, California (Hispanic)
 Santa Clara County, California (Chinese (including Taiwanese), Filipino, Hispanic, Vietnamese))
 Stanislaus County, California (Hispanic)
 Tulare County, California (Hispanic)
 Ventura County, California (Hispanic)

Colorado
 Conejos County, Colorado (Hispanic)
 Costilla County, Colorado (Hispanic)
 Denver County, Colorado (Hispanic)
 La Plata County, Colorado (American Indian (Ute))
 Montezuma County, Colorado (American Indian (Ute))
 Saguache County, Colorado (Hispanic)

Connecticut
 Bridgeport, Connecticut (Hispanic)
 East Hartford, Connecticut (Hispanic)
 Hartford, Connecticut (Hispanic)
 Kent, Connecticut (American Indian (All other American Indian Tribes))
 Meriden, Connecticut (Hispanic)
 New Britain, Connecticut (Hispanic)
 New Haven, Connecticut (Hispanic)
 New London, Connecticut (Hispanic)
 Waterbury, Connecticut (Hispanic)
 Windham, Connecticut (Hispanic)

Florida 
In addition to the jurisdictions enumerated below, Florida has state coverage for the Hispanic Language Minority Group.
 Broward County, Florida (Hispanic)
 DeSoto County, Florida (Hispanic)
 Hardee County, Florida (Hispanic)
 Hendry County, Florida (Hispanic)
 Hillsborough County, Florida (Hispanic)
 Lee County, Florida (Hispanic)
 Miami-Dade County, Florida (Hispanic)
 Orange County, Florida (Hispanic)
 Osceola County, Florida (Hispanic)
 Palm Beach County, Florida (Hispanic)
 Pinellas County, Florida (Hispanic)
 Polk County, Florida (Hispanic)
 Seminole County, Florida (Hispanic)

Georgia
 Gwinnett County, Georgia (Hispanic)

Hawaii
 Honolulu County (Chinese (including Taiwanese), Filipino))

Idaho
 Lincoln County, Idaho (Hispanic)

Illinois
 Cook County, Illinois (Asian Indian, Chinese (including Taiwanese), Hispanic))
 Kane County, Illinois (Hispanic)
 Lake County, Illinois (Hispanic)

Iowa
 Buena Vista County, Iowa (Hispanic)
 Tama County, Iowa (American Indian (All other American Indian Tribes))

Kansas
 Finney County, Kansas (Hispanic)
 Ford County, Kansas (Hispanic)
 Grant County, Kansas (Hispanic)
 Haskell County, Kansas (Hispanic)
 Seward County, Kansas (Hispanic)

Maryland
 Montgomery County, Maryland (Hispanic)

Massachusetts
 Boston, Massachusetts (Hispanic)
 Chelsea, Massachusetts (Hispanic)
 Holyoke, Massachusetts (Hispanic)
 Lawrence, Massachusetts (Hispanic)
 Lowell, Massachusetts (Cambodian, Hispanic)
 Lynn, Massachusetts (Hispanic)
 Malden, Massachusetts (Chinese (including Taiwanese))
 Quincy, Massachusetts (Chinese (including Taiwanese))
 Revere, Massachusetts (Hispanic)
 Southbridge, Massachusetts (Hispanic)
 Springfield, Massachusetts (Hispanic)
 Worcester, Massachusetts (Hispanic)

Michigan
Colfax, Michigan (Hispanic)
Fennville, Michigan (Hispanic)
Hamtramck, Michigan (Bangladeshi)

Mississippi
 Attala County, Mississippi (American Indian (Choctaw))
 Jackson County, Mississippi (American Indian (Choctaw))
 Jones County, Mississippi (American Indian (Choctaw))
 Kemper County, Mississippi (American Indian (Choctaw))
 Leake County, Mississippi (American Indian (Choctaw))
 Neshoba County, Mississippi (American Indian (Choctaw))
 Newton County, Mississippi (American Indian (Choctaw))
 Noxubee County, Mississippi (American Indian (Choctaw))
 Scott County, Mississippi (American Indian (Choctaw))
 Winston County, Mississippi (American Indian (Choctaw))

Nebraska
 Colfax County, Nebraska (Hispanic)
 Dakota County, Nebraska (Hispanic)
 Dawson County, Nebraska (Hispanic)

Nevada
 Clark County, Nevada (Filipino, Hispanic)

New Jersey
 Bergen County, New Jersey (Hispanic, Korean)
 Camden County, New Jersey (Hispanic)
 Cumberland County, New Jersey (Hispanic)
 Essex County, New Jersey (Hispanic)
 Hudson County, New Jersey (Hispanic)
 Middlesex County, New Jersey (Asian Indian, Hispanic)
 Passaic County, New Jersey (Hispanic)
 Union County, New Jersey (Hispanic)

New Mexico
 Bernalillo County, New Mexico (American Indian (Navajo), Hispanic))
 Chaves County, New Mexico (Hispanic)
 Cibola County, New Mexico (American Indian (Navajo))
 Doña Ana County, New Mexico (Hispanic)
 Guadalupe County, New Mexico (Hispanic)
 Hidalgo County, New Mexico (Hispanic)
 Lea County, New Mexico (Hispanic)
 Lincoln County, New Mexico (American Indian (Apache))
 Luna County, New Mexico (Hispanic)
 McKinley County, New Mexico (American Indian (Navajo))
 Mora County, New Mexico (Hispanic)
 Otero County, New Mexico (American Indian (Apache))
 Rio Arriba County, New Mexico (American Indian (Navajo))
 San Juan County, New Mexico (American Indian (Navajo), American Indian (Ute))
 San Miguel County, New Mexico (Hispanic)
 Sandoval County, New Mexico (American Indian (Navajo), American Indian (Pueblo))
 Santa Fe County, New Mexico (American Indian (Pueblo))
 Socorro County, New Mexico (American Indian (Navajo), Hispanic))
 Union County, New Mexico (Hispanic)
 Valencia County, New Mexico (Hispanic)

New York
 Bronx County, New York (Hispanic)
 Kings County, New York (Chinese (including Taiwanese), Hispanic))
 Nassau County, New York (Hispanic)
 New York County, New York (Chinese (including Taiwanese), Hispanic))
 Queens County, New York (Asian Indian, Chinese (including Taiwanese), Hispanic, Korean))
 Suffolk County, New York (Hispanic)
 Westchester County, New York (Hispanic)

Oklahoma
 Texas County, Oklahoma (Hispanic)

Pennsylvania
Berks County, Pennsylvania (Hispanic)
Lehigh County, Pennsylvania (Hispanic)
Philadelphia County, Pennsylvania (Hispanic)

Rhode Island
 Central Falls, Rhode Island (Hispanic)
 Pawtucket, Rhode Island (Hispanic)
 Providence, Rhode Island (Hispanic)

Texas 
In addition to the jurisdictions enumerated below, Texas has state coverage for the Hispanic Language Minority Group.
 Andrews County, Texas (Hispanic)
 Atascosa County, Texas (Hispanic)
 Bailey County, Texas (Hispanic)
 Bee County, Texas (Hispanic)
 Bexar County, Texas (Hispanic)
 Brooks County, Texas (Hispanic)
 Caldwell County, Texas (Hispanic)
 Calhoun County, Texas (Hispanic)
 Cameron County, Texas (Hispanic)
 Castro County, Texas (Hispanic)
 Cochran County, Texas (Hispanic)
 Crane County, Texas (Hispanic)
 Crockett County, Texas (Hispanic)
 Crosby County, Texas (Hispanic)
 Culberson County, Texas (Hispanic)
 Dallam County, Texas (Hispanic)
 Dallas County, Texas (Hispanic)
 Dawson County, Texas (Hispanic)
 Deaf Smith County, Texas (Hispanic)
 Dimmit County, Texas (Hispanic)
 Duval County, Texas (Hispanic)
 Ector County, Texas (Hispanic)
 Edwards County, Texas (Hispanic)
 El Paso County, Texas (American Indian (Pueblo), Hispanic))
 Floyd County, Texas (Hispanic)
 Fort Bend County, Texas (Hispanic)
 Frio County, Texas (Hispanic)
 Gaines County, Texas (Hispanic)
 Garza County, Texas (Hispanic)
 Glasscock County, Texas (Hispanic)
 Hale County, Texas (Hispanic)
 Hansford County, Texas (Hispanic)
 Harris County, Texas (Chinese (including Taiwanese), Hispanic, Vietnamese))
 Hidalgo County, Texas (Hispanic)
 Hockley County, Texas (Hispanic)
 Hudspeth County, Texas (Hispanic)
 Jeff Davis County, Texas (Hispanic)
 Jim Hogg County, Texas (Hispanic)
 Jim Wells County, Texas (Hispanic)
 Jones County, Texas (Hispanic)
 Karnes County, Texas (Hispanic)
 Kenedy County, Texas (Hispanic)
 Kinney County, Texas (Hispanic)
 Kleberg County, Texas (Hispanic)
 Knox County, Texas (Hispanic)
 La Salle County, Texas (Hispanic)
 Lamb County, Texas (Hispanic)
 Live Oak County, Texas (Hispanic)
 Lynn County, Texas (Hispanic)
 Martin County, Texas (Hispanic)
 Matagorda County, Texas (Hispanic)
 Maverick County, Texas (American Indian (All other American Indian Tribes), Hispanic))
 McMullen County, Texas (Hispanic)
 Medina County, Texas (Hispanic)
 Menard County, Texas (Hispanic)
 Midland County, Texas (Hispanic)
 Moore County, Texas (Hispanic)
 Nolan County, Texas (Hispanic)
 Nueces County, Texas (Hispanic)
 Ochiltree County, Texas (Hispanic)
 Parmer County, Texas (Hispanic)
 Pecos County, Texas (Hispanic)
 Presidio County, Texas (Hispanic)
 Reagan County, Texas (Hispanic)
 Reeves County, Texas (Hispanic)
 Refugio County, Texas (Hispanic)
 San Patricio County, Texas (Hispanic)
 Schleicher County, Texas (Hispanic)
 Scurry County, Texas (Hispanic)
 Sherman County, Texas (Hispanic)
 Starr County, Texas (Hispanic)
 Sterling County, Texas (Hispanic)
 Sutton County, Texas (Hispanic)
 Swisher County, Texas (Hispanic)
 Tarrant County, Texas (Hispanic, Vietnamese)
 Terry County, Texas (Hispanic)
 Titus County, Texas (Hispanic)
 Travis County, Texas (Hispanic)
 Upton County, Texas (Hispanic)
 Uvalde County, Texas (Hispanic)
 Val Verde County, Texas (Hispanic)
 Ward County, Texas (Hispanic)
 Webb County, Texas (Hispanic)
 Willacy County, Texas (Hispanic)
 Winkler County, Texas (Hispanic)
 Yoakum County, Texas (Hispanic)
 Zapata County, Texas (Hispanic)
 Zavala County, Texas (Hispanic)

Utah
 San Juan County, Utah (American Indian (Navajo), American Indian (Ute))

Virginia
 Fairfax County, Virginia (Hispanic, Vietnamese)

Washington
 Adams County, Washington (Hispanic)
 Franklin County, Washington (Hispanic)
 King County, Washington (Chinese (including Taiwanese), Vietnamese))
 Yakima County, Washington (Hispanic)

Wisconsin
 Arcadia, Wisconsin (Hispanic)
 Madison, Wisconsin (Hispanic)
 Milwaukee, Wisconsin (Hispanic)

References

History of voting rights in the United States